Frank Webster may refer to:

 Frank Webster (sociologist) (born 1950), British sociologist
 Frank Webster (politician), Australian politician 
 Frank Blake Webster (1850–1922), ornithological publisher, taxidermist and natural history dealer
 Frank Daniel Webster (1866–1932), US Army General in World War I
 Frank V. Webster, a pseudonym controlled by the Stratemeyer Syndicate, the first book packager of books aimed at children
 Frank Webster, fictional character in the 1954 film, The Fast and the Furious